The Primetime Emmy Award for Outstanding Outstanding Sound Editing for a Nonfiction or Reality Program (Single or Multi-Camera) is awarded to one television documentary, nonfiction or reality series each year.

In the following list, the first titles listed in gold are the winners; those not in gold are nominees, which are listed in alphabetical order. The years given are those in which the ceremonies took place:



Winners and nominations

1970s

1990s

2000s

2010s

2020s

Notes

References

External links
 Academy of Television Arts and Sciences website

Sound Editing for Nonfiction Programming (Single or Multi-Camera)